Tommylee Lewis (born October 24, 1992) is an American football wide receiver and return specialist who is a free agent. He played college football at Northern Illinois and signed with the Saints as an undrafted free agent in 2016.

Early years
Lewis began high school at Inlet Grove High School before transferring to Palm Beach Lakes Community High School. At Palm Beach Lakes, he ran into trouble off the field and struggled with academic eligibility. He later transferred to William T. Dwyer High School at the insistence of former youth football teammate Curt Maggitt. At Dwyer, he was teammates with Nick O'Leary and Jacoby Brissett.

College career
Lewis played college football for Northern Illinois, the only Football Bowl Subdivision program to take interest in him. As a junior in 2013, he was named to the All-Mid-American Conference First Team and an honorable mention All-American by Sports Illustrated. In 2014, he missed all but two games due to lower body injuries and was granted a medical redshirt. As a senior, he missed four games due to injury. In 48 games, he caught eleven touchdown passes, had four kick return touchdowns, ran for three touchdowns and passed for one.

Professional career

New Orleans Saints
After not being selected in the 2016 NFL Draft, the New Orleans Saints signed Lewis on May 2, 2016, on a recommendation from Pro Football Hall of Fame coach Bill Parcells, who was a friend of Lewis' high school coach. After impressing during training camp and the preseason as both a receiver and returner, Lewis made the Saints 53-man roster. He played in 12 games with one start, recording seven catches for 76 yards along with 312 total return yards. He recorded his first touchdown on December 7, 2017, against the Atlanta Falcons. In the 2017 season, he had 10 receptions for 116 yards and one receiving touchdown.

On September 19, 2018, Lewis was placed on injured reserve after suffering a knee injury on a punt return in Week 2 against the Cleveland Browns. He was activated off injured reserve on November 21, 2018, and scored his second career touchdown, also against the Atlanta Falcons.

On January 20, 2019, in the final minutes of the NFC Championship game against the Los Angeles Rams, Lewis was involved in a controversial moment with Rams cornerback Nickell Robey-Coleman. Robey-Coleman made a helmet-to-helmet hit on Lewis which would have been called for pass interference or a personal foul, but neither came about. It would have set the Saints up with a short field goal opportunity and a chance to run out the clock. However, the referees missed the call. The Saints would go on to lose the game in overtime, 23–26,. Later on, the league admitted that they blew the call and Coleman confessed to committing the penalty either way.

Detroit Lions
On March 19, 2019, Lewis signed with the Detroit Lions. He was released during final roster cuts on August 30, 2019.

In October 2019, Lewis was selected by the Dallas Renegades in the second round of the 2020 XFL Draft.

New Orleans Saints (second stint)
On January 27, 2020, Lewis signed a reserve/future contract with the New Orleans Saints. He was waived on August 2, 2020.

Carolina Panthers
On August 16, 2020, Lewis signed with the Carolina Panthers. He was waived/injured on September 2, 2020, and subsequently reverted to the team's injured reserve list the next day. He was waived with an injury settlement on September 4.

New Orleans Saints (third stint)
On October 8, 2020, Lewis was signed to the New Orleans Saints' practice squad. He was promoted to the active roster on October 31. He was waived on November 2 and re-signed to the practice squad two days later. He was elevated to the active roster on December 5 and 12 for the team's weeks 13 and 14 games against the Atlanta Falcons and Philadelphia Eagles, and reverted to the practice squad after each game. He was signed to the active roster on December 19, 2020, and waived on December 24. On December 30, 2020, Lewis re-signed with the Saints' practice squad. He was elevated again on January 2, 2021, for the week 17 game against the Carolina Panthers, and reverted to the practice squad again following the game. His practice squad contract with the team expired after the season on January 25, 2021.

On July 30, 2021, Lewis signed a one-year deal with the Saints. He was waived on August 21.

Miami Dolphins
On December 13, 2021, Lewis was signed to the Miami Dolphins practice squad. He was promoted to the active roster on December 24.

References

External links
New Orleans Saints bio
Northern Illinois Huskies bio

1992 births
Living people
Sportspeople from Palm Beach, Florida
Players of American football from Florida
American football wide receivers
Northern Illinois Huskies football players
New Orleans Saints players
Detroit Lions players
Carolina Panthers players
Miami Dolphins players